The Lillehammer Wolfpack are an American football team based in Lillehammer, Norway. They are former members of the Norway American Football Federation (NoAFF), having entered the league in 1998.

American football teams in Norway